Jason Couch (born November 8, 1969) is a ten-pin bowler on the Professional Bowlers Association (PBA) Tour, and a member of the PBA and USBC Halls of Fame. A left-handed cranker, Couch graduated from Clermont High School in Clermont, Florida and still resides in Clermont. He owns 16 PBA Tour titles, including four major championships, plus one title on the PBA50 Tour.

PBA career
Couch joined the PBA in 1991. In his first full season (1992), he won PBA Rookie of the Year honors. Jason's first title came at the 1993 Tums Classic, defeating Brian Voss in the final match. Later that year he won his first major title at the 1993 Touring Players Championship. After four more titles between 1995 and 1999, Couch pulled off an historic "three-peat" in the Tournament of Champions, winning consecutive events in 1999, 2000 and 2002. (The event was not contested in 2001 because the PBA switched from a calendar year to a fall-spring seasonal format.)

Couch's 14th and 15th career titles came in back-to-back events in 2007, the first and only time he had done this in his career. After a four-year drought, he won his 16th and final PBA Tour title at the 2011 Mark Roth Plastic Ball Championship, an event where players were limited to only two older-technology plastic bowling balls for the entire tournament.

Couch earned over $1.7 million over his PBA Tour career. He had season-ending knee surgery in 2007 and had to defer his 2007–08 exemption to 2008–09. He was ranked #24 on the PBA's 2008–09 list of "50 Greatest Players of the Last 50 Years."  Through the end of the 2010–11 season, Jason had recorded 41 perfect 300 games in PBA events. In February, 2012, he was elected to the PBA Hall of Fame. Also in 2012, Couch announced his retirement from full-time competitive bowling on the PBA Tour, although he continued to have a role on the tour as a ball representative for Ebonite and as current manager of the Philadelphia Hitmen PBA League team.

Couch joined the PBA50 Tour in 2020, only to have the season canceled due to the COVID-19 pandemic. He won the second event of the 2021 season, the Johnny Petraglia BVL Open, for his first PBA50 Tour title.

PBA Tour titles
Major championships are in bold text.

 1993 Tums Classic (Windsor Locks, Connecticut)
 1993 Touring Players Championship (Indianapolis, Indiana)
 1995 Bowlers Journal Classic (Mechanicsburg, Pennsylvania)
 1995 Indianapolis Open (Indianapolis, Indiana)
 1998 Showboat Invitational (Las Vegas, Nevada)
 1999 Bay City Classic (Bay City, Michigan)
 1999 Brunswick World Tournament of Champions (Overland Park, Kansas)
 2000 Brunswick World Tournament of Champions (Lake Zurich, Illinois)
 2001 The Villages PBA Open (The Villages, Florida)
 2002 PBA Tournament of Champions at Mohegan Sun (Uncasville, Connecticut)
 2003 PBA Pepsi Open (Grand Rapids, Michigan)
 2005 Chicago Classic (Vernon Hills, Illinois)
 2006 Dick Weber Open (Fountain Valley, California)
 2007 Dick Weber Open (Fountain Valley, California)
 2007 Motel 6 Classic (Henderson, Nevada)
 2011 Mark Roth Plastic Ball Championship (Cheektowaga, New York)

PBA50 Tour titles
 2021 Johnny Petraglia BVL Open (Clearwater, Florida)

Awards and recognition
 1992 PBA Rookie of the Year
 Won at least one PBA title in six straight seasons (1998 through 2003-04)
 One of only three three-time winners in the Tournament of Champions (with Mike Durbin and Jason Belmonte), and the only one to win three consecutive TOC events
 Elected to the PBA Hall of Fame in 2012.
 Elected to the United States Bowling Congress Hall of Fame in 2013.

Sources
 PBA.com, official site of the Professional Bowlers Association
 http://www.jasoncouch.com, official Jason Couch fan site

References

American ten-pin bowling players
1969 births
Living people